William Frederick King  (February 19, 1854 – April 23, 1916) was a Canadian surveyor, astronomer, and civil servant.

Born in Stowmarket, England, the son of William King and Ellen Archer, King emigrated to Port Hope, Upper Canada with his family when he was eight.  In 1869, he started studying at the University of Toronto. He left in 1872 to work as a sub-assistant astronomer for the international boundary survey in Western Canada. He returned to the University of Toronto and received a Bachelor of Arts degree in mathematics in 1874. In 1875, he was working as an assistant in the Canadian survey of lands in the northwest.

After becoming a dominion land surveyor and dominion topographical surveyor in 1876, he started working as an astronomical assistant for the federal Department of the Interior. He became a permanent civil servant as inspector of surveys in 1881, chief inspector in 1886, and Canada's first chief astronomer in 1890.  In 1905, he was appointed founding director of the Dominion Observatory.

In 1908, he was made a Companion of the Order of St Michael and St George and a Fellow of the Royal Society of Canada. He served as president of the Royal Society of Canada from 1911 to 1912. In 1909, he was made a Fellow of the Royal Astronomical Society of Canada.

References

External links
 

1854 births
1916 deaths
19th-century Canadian astronomers
19th-century Canadian civil servants
Canadian surveyors
University of Toronto alumni
Canadian Companions of the Order of St Michael and St George
Fellows of the Royal Society of Canada
People from Stowmarket
Persons of National Historic Significance (Canada)
20th-century Canadian astronomers